Barbara Pexa (born 14 February 1975) is a Guamanian breaststroke swimmer. She competed in two events at the 1992 Summer Olympics.

References

External links
 

1975 births
Living people
Guamanian female breaststroke swimmers
Olympic swimmers of Guam
Swimmers at the 1992 Summer Olympics
Place of birth missing (living people)
21st-century American women